Gaston-Robert, Marquis de Banneville (26 April 1818 – 13 June 1881) was a French diplomat of the nineteenth century.

1818 births
1881 deaths
Marquesses of Banneville
French Foreign Ministers
Politicians of the French Third Republic
Banneville, Gaston-Robert, marquis de